In Japanese popular culture, a , also romanized as bishojo or bishoujo, is a cute girl character. Bishōjo characters appear ubiquitously in media including manga, anime, and computer games (especially in the bishojo game genre), and also appear in advertising and as mascots, such as for maid cafés. An attraction towards bishōjo characters is a key concept in otaku (manga and anime fan) subculture.

The development of the bishōjo aesthetic in manga of the early 1980s marked a departure from previous realistic styles, and the emergence of the aesthetic of "cute eroticism" (kawaii ero) and moe.

History

The bishōjo character type emerged in the lolicon boom of the early 1980s, particularly in the works of manga artist Hideo Azuma. Azuma's characters combined the round bodies of Osamu Tezuka characters and the round and emotive faces of shōjo manga. At the time, the dominant style in seinen and pornographic manga was gekiga, a realistic style characterized by sharp angles, dark hatching, and gritty lines; in contrast, Azuma's work displayed light shading and clean, circular lines. In doing so, Azuma developed "cute eroticism" (kawaii ero), a form of eroticism based on manga-style characters. Lolicon (derived from "Lolita complex") was one of several terms referring to this expansion in cute characters in manga and anime, and a corresponding attraction to and affection for such characters. Synonyms include "two-dimensional complex" (nijigen konpurekkusu), "two-dimensional fetishism" (nijikon fechi), "two-dimensional syndrome" (nijikon shōkōgun), "cute girl syndrome" (bishōjo shōkōgun), and simply "sickness" (byōki).

Several characters created by Hayao Miyazaki are considered icons of the bishōjo boom, particularly Clarisse from the film Lupin III: Castle of Cagliostro (1979), Lana from the TV series Future Boy Conan (1978), and Nausicaä from his manga and film Nausicaä of the Valley of the Wind (1984). Another creator strongly associated with the boom was Rumiko Takahashi, whose character Lum from her manga Urusei Yatsura (1978–1987) gained immense popularity. Cultural critic Hiroki Azuma identifies Lum as a key development in fan interaction and response to bishōjo characters:

Features
Bishōjo characters are typified by design elements (such as personality archetypes, clothing, and accessories) that are known and acknowledged by the audience.

Media

Bishōjo characters appear in almost all genres of anime and manga and in many video games, especially in dating sims and visual novels, sometimes to get more players or simply just to make a game look good. Bishōjo characters tend to attract  males. Bishōjo characters sometimes are the most popular female characters as most people like anime, manga, dating sims, and visual novels more when the art stands out, looks pretty, and has beautiful females.

Bishōjo games
Games that are made with the intent of featuring bishōjo characters are known as bishōjo games. Because visual novels are considered games as well, bishōjo games also encapsulate visual novels made with the intent of featuring bishōjo characters. Although bishōjo games are made with a male audience in mind, they can extend to a female audience as well, such as the Touhou project.

Confusion regarding terminology
Although bishōjo is not a genre but a character design, series which predominantly feature such characters, such as harem anime and visual novels, are sometimes informally called bishōjo series. The characters and works referred to by the term bishōjo are typically intended to appeal to a male audience. Since one of the main draws of these series is typically the art and the attractive female characters, the term is occasionally perceived negatively, as a genre which is solely dependent on the marketability of beautiful characters rather than the actual content or plot.

The word bishōjo is sometimes confused with the similar-sounding shōjo ("girl") demographic, but bishōjo refers to the gender and traits of the characters it describes, whereas shōjo refers to the gender and age of an audience demographic – manga publications, and sometimes anime, described as "shōjo" are aimed at young female audiences.

Bishōjo is not to be confused with bishōnen – beautiful boy. It is also not to be confused with moe – which is a definition for a genre of entertainment which features cute/adorable girls rather than "sexy" girls.

See also

 
  game

References

Works cited
 

Female stock characters in anime and manga
Japanese slang
Girls